Bishwa Bandhu Thapa is a Nepalese politician.

He was elected as a Members of Parliament (MP) in the 1959 Nepalese general election. Thapa coined the term "Panchayat", party less political system created by King Mahendra.

Thapa was born in 1927.

References

Further reading 

 

1927 births
Living people
Nepal MPs 1959–1960
Nepalese revolutionaries
Nepali Congress politicians from Bagmati Province